Abacetus globulicollis is a species of ground beetle in the subfamily Pterostichinae. It was described by Straneo in 1971.

References

globulicollis
Beetles described in 1971